Brochymena quadripustulata, known generally as the four-humped stink bug or rough stink bug, is a species of stink bug in the family Pentatomidae. It is found in Africa, Central America, North America, and Oceania.

References

External links

 

Articles created by Qbugbot
Insects described in 1775
Taxa named by Johan Christian Fabricius
Halyini